"Brown Sugar" is a song by American recording artist D'Angelo, taken from his debut album of the same name (1995). The song was released as the album's lead single in 1995, through the Cooltempo label. The song was written and produced by D'Angelo and frequent collaborator Ali Shaheed Muhammad.

Composition
Opened by falsetto ad-libs, an organ refrain and pulsating bass lines, the title track "Brown Sugar" features a dark, thick texture and a gutbucket-jazz style and rhythm. The instrumentation throughout the song, highlighted by Jimmy Smith-style organ work, atmospheric percussion and snapping snare drums, has been described by music writers as "organic". The song's sound is also similar to the work of funk, soul and jazz musician Roy Ayers, while D'Angelo's soulful tenor-delivery throughout the song's verses is stylistically similar the flow of most emcees at the time.

Misinterpreted as a traditional love song about a femme fatale by most R&B audiences, "Brown Sugar" is an ode to marijuana use through its use of the personification of a brown-skinned woman. This thematic substitution is a conventional lyrical technique in hip hop. Music journalist Peter Shapiro wrote of the song's lyrical content, stating "D'Angelo was extolling the pleasures of pot-fuelled solipsism ('Always down for a ménage à trois/But I think I'ma hit it solo/Hope my niggaz don't mind') and intimating that love, or at least love of the herb, leads to insanity ('Brown sugar babe/I gets high off you love/Don't know how to behave')." Writer and academic Todd Boyd compared the song, along with Dr. Dre's The Chronic (1992) and Styles P's "Good Times" (2002), to Rick James's "Mary Jane" (1978), stating that the song "celebrated his love for gettin' blazed and spawned ... a truly large following."

Critical reception
Gil Robertson IV from Cash Box wrote, "It blends the right mix of down home slow groove funk with a caressing jazz texture that’s bound to get folks out on the dance floor. Produced by Ali from A Tribe Called Quest, this track is loaded with a classic old school led and provides a great introduction for this promising young talent." He also picked it as a standout track of the album. Ann Powers from Spin described it as "softcore", remarking that songs like "Brown Sugar" "get serious with soul's erotic undercurrents, reaching for the exquisite tension of early Prince and late Marvin Gaye."

Credits
Written by D'Angelo and Ali Shaheed Muhammed 
Produced by D'Angelo and Ali Shaheed Muhammad 
Vocal arrangements by D'Angelo All vocals by D'Angelo 
Musical arrangements by D'Angelo 
All instruments by D'Angelo 
Drum programming by Ali Shaheed Muhammad 
Recorded at Battery Studios, NYC
Additional engineering by Tim Latham at Soundtrack, NYC 
Mixed by Bob Power at Battery Studios, NYC 
Assistant engineer: G-Spot

Charts

Weekly charts

Year-end charts

References

External links

1995 songs
1995 singles
D'Angelo songs
EMI Records singles
Songs written by Ali Shaheed Muhammad
Songs about cannabis